The Cathedral of the Holy Spirit, alternatively known as the St. Esprit Cathedral (Turkish: Saint Esprit Kilisesi), located on Cumhuriyet Avenue 127/A, in the quarter of Pangaltı in Şişli district, the former Harbiye, between Taksim Square and Nişantaşı, is one of the main Catholic churches in Istanbul, Turkey. This 19th century cathedral is behind the walls of the French Notre Dame de Sion high school. While walking from Taksim towards Harbiye, some may notice a door with metal bars leading to the school's courtyard beyond which is a statue of Benedict XV. Past the door stands the cathedral.

The Cathedral of the Holy Spirit is the second largest Roman Catholic church in the city after the Basilica of S. Antonio di Padova on İstiklal Avenue in Beyoğlu.
The cathedral is the see of the Bishop, the church where the "cathedra" is situated. The basilica was built in Baroque style in 1846 under the direction of the Swiss-Italian architect Gaspare Fossati and the Italian architect Achille Bottazzi, while the French Julien Hillereau was its Archbishop and whose tomb is in the crypt underneath the cathedral.

Gaspare Fossati was a Swiss-Italian architect working in Istanbul in the 19th century. He is known as the second European architect to have come to Istanbul to work when Western-style buildings began to be popular and thus widespread across the city. He built many famous 19th century buildings, including the Russian Embassy, the Consulate of the Netherlands and Saint Peter and Paul's Church located in Galata. Fossati also worked on the restoration of the Hagia Sophia along with his brother Giuseppe Fossati.

The site where the cathedral stands was chosen because the Vatican decided to stablish its unofficial office in Istanbul on the same street. The office serves today in an official capacity as Turkey and the Vatican agreed on establishing mutual diplomatic representative offices in 1960.

Construction took one year, it started in 1845 and the cathedral was completed in 1846. Financial difficulties led to poorer quality construction materials and following an earthquake in 1865, the cathedral was badly damaged. Restoration began in June of the same year and the church reopened for service a few months later in December.  Architect Pierre Vitalis, with the help of another architect, was supposed to rebuild the Holy Spirit following the earthquake, but nothing came of this as Vitalis went into retirement. As a result, the cathedral's rebuilding was led by Father Antoine Giorgiovitch, church sources say. According to historical sources, the church was designated a cathedral in 1876. It has undergone several restorations so far, receiving three new bells hammered in Fermo, Italy in 1922 and having all its paintings restored by late Bishop Antoine Marovitch in 1980.

Following the construction of the cathedral, the Christian community began settling nearby, according to historical sources. In other words, the Holy Spirit played a leading role in the Christian community moving beyond the Beyoğlu district (formerly known as Pera) and Galata areas, predominantly non-Muslim at the time. The cathedral's administrative rights were entrusted to the Salesians of Don Bosco on October 9, 1989.

The architecture of the cathedral, which has a basilica plan with three naves, represents the Baroque style. Some art historians define the cathedral's architecture as the revival of the early Christian basilica type. The main apse and the side apses have a square shape. The gallery rests upon columns separating the naves that line the two sides of the cathedral in rows.

The interior of the basilica is beautifully decorated with frescoes. The richly decorated ceiling runs until the altar, situated just across the main door. The bell tower, at one of the Holy Spirit's corners overlooks Ölçek Sokak (street) which also goes by the name Papa Roncalli Sokak since the year 2000, when Mustafa Sarıgül, Mayor of Şişli, dedicated it to the "friend of the Turks" Angelo Giuseppe Roncalli, who had been the Apostolic Delegate, i.e. Ambassador of the Pope, in Turkey from January 1935 to December 1944. If you find yourself walking by The Cathedral of the Holy Spirit, take some time to step inside this cathedral, even outside of service times.

The Holy Spirit's courtyard houses a bronze statue of Pope Benedict XV (1854-1922) built by the Turkish state in 1922 in remembrance of his support to Turkish soldiers. The statue rests upon a stone pedestal with a plaque that reads: "Benefactor of all people, regardless of nationality or religion". Pope Benedict XV presided over the Catholic Church between 1914 and 1922, and is known for his efforts to stop World War I. He also contributed to the establishment of a hospital on the Turkish-Syrian border where wounded Turkish soldiers were treated. The statue was cleaned by Istanbul Greater Municipality in 2006 shortly before Pope Benedict XVI  visit to the city. Sultan Mehmet VI is believed to have contributed 500 gold liras to the funds collected for the erection of the statue.

The cathedral's burial cript is said to be very imposing. These vaults designed during the construction of the cathedral, house the mortal remains of various members of Istanbul's Catholic community, including nuns from Notre Dame de Sion and the Archbishop Hillereau. Giuseppe Donizetti, the royal musician at the court of Ottoman Sultan Mahmud II, who invited him to Istanbul in the first place, is buried in the vaults beneath the cathedral. He is known for two military marches he composed for Sultans Mahmud II and Abdülmecit I: "Mahmudiye March". Today, what remains of the Donizetti family archives, discovered in the 1970s, is preserved at the Topkapı Palace Museum Library. Burials in the vaults continued until the 1920s.

The cathedral has been a destination of several papal visits to Turkey, including those of Pope Paul VI, Pope John Paul II, Pope Benedict XVI. Pope Francis visited the cathedral on November 29, 2014, and celebrated mass for a thousand people. He also came on November 30, celebration of Saint Andrew, to meet more than a hundred Iraqi and Syrian refugees as well as African migrants.

See also
 Levantines (Latin Christians)

References 

 Haaretz article on the visit of Pope Benedict XVI (Archived)

Today's Zaman/St. Sprit Cathedral
Governorship of Istanbul/Gallery
Istanbul Photographs/St. Sprit Cathedral

External links 

Roman Catholic churches in Istanbul
Roman Catholic cathedrals in Turkey
Roman Catholic churches completed in 1846
19th-century Roman Catholic church buildings in Turkey
Baroque architecture in the Ottoman Empire
Baroque church buildings
Şişli
Cathedrals in Istanbul